Oscar Peter Buneman,  (born 1943) is a British computer scientist who works in the areas of database systems and database theory.

Education
Buneman was educated at the University of Cambridge, where he was awarded a Bachelor of Arts while studying the Cambridge Mathematical Tripos from Gonville and Caius College, Cambridge. Buneman went on to study at the University of Warwick, where he received his PhD in 1970.

Career
Following his PhD, Buneman worked briefly at the University of Edinburgh, followed by a professorship of computer science at the University of Pennsylvania, which he held for several decades. In 2002, he moved to the University of Edinburgh, where he built up the database research group. He is one of the founders and the Associate Director of Research of the UK Digital Curation Centre, which is located in Edinburgh.

Buneman is known for his research in database systems and database theory, in particular for establishing connections between databases and programming language theory, such as introducing monad-based query languages for nested relations and complex object databases.
He also pioneered research on managing semi-structured data, and, recently, research on data provenance, annotations, and digital curation.

In computational biology, he is known for his work on reconstructing phylogenetic trees based on Buneman graphs, which are named in his honour.

Awards and honours
Buneman is a Fellow of the Royal Society, fellow of the ACM, a fellow of the Royal Society of Edinburgh, and has won a Royal Society Wolfson Research Merit Award.
He has chaired both flagship research conferences in data management, SIGMOD (in 1993) and VLDB (in 2008), as well as the main database theory conference, PODS (in 2001).

Buneman was appointed Member of the Order of the British Empire (MBE) in the 2013 New Year Honours for services to data systems and computing. His nomination for the Royal Society reads

Personal life
Buneman is the son of physicist Oscar Buneman.

References

Fellows of the Association for Computing Machinery
Database researchers
British computer scientists
Fellows of the Royal Society
Fellows of the Royal Society of Edinburgh
Academics of the University of Edinburgh
Alumni of the University of Warwick
Members of the Order of the British Empire
Royal Society Wolfson Research Merit Award holders
University of Pennsylvania faculty
Living people
1943 births